Church of St. Catherine (Croatian: Crkva sv. Katarine) is a Baroque-style church in Zagreb.

History
Before the St. Catherine's was built, a 14th-century Dominican church occupied the area. When the Jesuits arrived in Zagreb in the early 17th century, they thought the original church too rundown and inadequate, and worked to build a new church. Construction began in 1620 and was completed in 1632. A monastery was built adjacent to the church, but now the spot is home to the Klovićevi dvori art gallery.

St. Catherine's church was victim to fire twice in history: once in 1645 and again in 1674, devastating the interior. The church was refurnished with help from wealthy Croatian nobles, and in return, they were allowed to display their family coat-of-arms or have the honour to be buried or entombed in the church.

After the disestablishment of the Jesuits, St. Catherine's became part of the parish of St. Mark's in 1793. Since 1874, St. Catherine's has been a Collegiate church.

The church was severely damaged by the 1880 earthquake. After 6 months of repairs, it was reconsecrated in November 1881.

Overview
The church is designed in the Baroque architecture of the 17th century.

Gallery

See also

 History of Zagreb
 List of Jesuit sites
 Zagreb Cathedral

References

Sources
 

17th-century Roman Catholic church buildings in Croatia
Roman Catholic churches completed in 1632
Religious buildings and structures in Zagreb
17th-century establishments in Croatia
1632 establishments in the Habsburg monarchy
Gornji Grad–Medveščak